The Brahmin and the Butterfly (literally "The Chrysalis and the Golden Butterfly") is a 1901 French short silent fantasy film, directed by Georges Méliès.

Synopsis
A Brahmin, playing the flute in a rainforest, lures a large caterpillar toward him. The caterpillar is placed in a cocoon, from which it emerges as a woman-butterfly. Infatuated, the Brahmin tries to capture her with a blanket; when she reappears from inside the blanket, she has turned into a princess. When the Brahmin attempts to kiss her, the princess transforms him into the caterpillar.

Production and themes
The Brahmin and the Butterfly was inspired by Buatier de Kolta's 1885 magic act Le Cocon, ou Le Ver à Soie. In the act, de Kolta drew a silkworm on paper; the paper broke to reveal a cocoon, which opened to reveal de Kolta's wife dressed as a butterfly. Méliès's film maintains the links to the myth of Pygmalion and Galatea, a theme beloved of stage magicians, but gives it a new comic twist. The ending of the film makes it unusual among Méliès's oeuvre: where usually his male characters lead the action and his female characters are reduced to supporting roles, here the butterfly-princess seizes control of the story and wins out over Méliès's own character.

Méliès appears in the film as the Brahmin. The effects for the film were created using stage machinery and substitution splices.

Release and reception
The Brahmin and the Butterfly was released by Méliès's Star Film Company and is listed as numbers 332–333 in its catalogues. Like many of Méliès's films, it was sold both in black-and-white and in a version hand-colored by the studio of Elisabeth Thuillier. The film survives only in black-and-white; in 1979, the film scholar Jacques Malthête recreated the hand-colored version using historically authentic technology, applying eight color tones to a black-and-white print.

The film was screened in 2000 at the Pordenone Silent Film Festival in Italy. The film scholar Paolo Cherchi Usai contributed a one-sentence program note: "The most beautiful love story of early cinema!"

References

External links 
 

1901 films
Films directed by Georges Méliès
French silent short films
French black-and-white films
Films about magic and magicians
French fantasy films
1900s fantasy films